Daniel Dixon (born 14 May 2002) is an English international triathlete and has represented England at the Commonwealth Games.

Biography
Dixon was named British Elite Champion in 2021. In 2022, he was selected for the 2022 Commonwealth Games in Birmingham where he competed in men's event, finishing in 12th place. Dixon was born in Newcastle Upon Tyne on the 14th May 2002. The triathlete has seen much success at a young age and his heralded by many as the future of the sport. Dixon is hoping to build on the success of his 12th place finish in 2022 and is aiming to reach the podium in 2023. The triathlete is dedicated to his profession and will be hoping that his future can be bright.

References

2002 births
Living people
English male triathletes
British male triathletes
Commonwealth Games competitors for England
Triathletes at the 2022 Commonwealth Games
21st-century English people